This is a list of onomatopoeias, i.e. words that imitate, resemble, or suggest the source of the sound that they describe. For more information, see the linked articles.

Human vocal sounds
Achoo, Atishoo
Chomp
Cough
Hiccup
Hum
Slurp

Sounds made by devices or other objects
Awooga, or Aooga, the sound of an old-fashioned vehicle horn
Beep, a high-pitched signal
Beep, beep, 1929 word for a car horn
Ching, the sound of metal on metal
Clink, the sound of glass on glass
Fizz, sound of effervescence
Flutter, sound of rapid motion, e.g. aeroelastic flutter
Oom-pah, the rhythmical sound of a deep brass instrument in a band
Slosh
Splash, sound of water upon disturbance
Tick tick tick, sound of a timer
Tick tock, sound of a clock
Vroom, sound of an engine revving up
Zap, sound of an electrostatic discharge

Things named after sounds
Choo Choo, childish word for a train, after the sound of a steam locomotive
Flip-flops, a type of sandal
Tuk-tuk, word for an auto rickshaw in parts of Asia, Africa, and Latin America 
Tweeter, a high frequency loudspeaker named after a bird's shrill tweet
Woofer, a low frequency loudspeaker named after a dog's low bark

Animal and bird names
Aye-aye
Bobolink
Bobwhite
Chachalaca
Chickadee
Chiffchaff
Chuck-will's-widow
Cuckoo
Curlew
Dickcissel
Dik-dik
Hadada
Hoopoe
Hoot owl
Kea
Killdeer
Mopoke, morepork or boobook owl
Pewee
Pobblebonk
Potoo
Poorwill
Weero
Whip-poor-will (Eastern)
Whip-poor-will (Mexican)
Willet

Animal and bird noises
For sounds listed by the name of the animal, see List of animal sounds.

English words for animal noises include:
Bark, sound of a dog
Bleat, sound of a sheep
Buzz, sound of bees or insects flying
Chirp, bird call
Chirp, sound made by rubbing together feet or other body parts, e.g. by a cricket or a cicada
Gobble, a turkey call
Growl, low, guttural vocalization produced by predatory animals
Hiss, sound made by a snake
Hoot, call of an owl
Howl, sound made by canines, especially wolves
Meow, cry of a cat
Moo, sound of a cow
Purr, a tonal, fluttering sound made by all members of the cat family
Quack, call of a duck
Ribbit, sound of some Pacific tree frogs or bullfrogs
Roar, deep, bellowing outburst made by various animals
Screech, high-pitched strident or piercing sound, as made by a screech owl
Tweet, sound of a bird
Woof, sound of a dog

Music groups or terms
Bebop, a style of jazz
Boom bap, a subgenre and production style of hip hop named after the sounds used for the bass and snare drums
Djent, a style of progressive metal named after the sound of a palm-muted guitar
Donk, a style of UK house music containing distinctive percussion sounds
Doof doof, Australian slang term describes electronic music heard at raves
Kecak, part of a musical drama, is named after monkey chatter, and "chak" is also the sound of a struck bar percussion instrument as in a gamelan
Oom-pah, brass instruments, also Humppa
Ratatat, a New York City experimental electronic rock duo
Wah-wah, the sound of altering the resonance of musical notes to extend expressiveness

Works, groups and characters named after sounds 

 "Boum!", a song
 Chitty Chitty Bang Bang, a car in film of the same name named for the unusual noise of its engine
 Clank, from the video game series "Ratchet & Clank"
 Cock a doodle doo, a nursery rhyme about a cockerel
 Kachi-kachi Yama, a Japanese folktale, named for the crackling of a fire
 Rattle and Hum, an album by the Irish band U2
 Snap, Crackle and Pop, advertising mascots for branded cereal
 Whaam!, pop art painting drawing from onomatopoeia in superhero comics (in this case, an explosion)
 Wham!, a 1980s English musical duo formed by members George Michael and Andrew Ridgeley

Sounds in fiction
Bamf, the sound Nightcrawler makes when teleporting
Pew-pew or pew-pew-pew, the sound of a laser gun in science fiction
Snikt, the sound of Wolverine's claws being extended
Thwip, the sound that Spider-Man's web shooters make
Vwoop, the sound of an Enderman from Minecraft teleporting
Vworp, the sound the TARDIS makes when it materializes

See also
"The Bells", a heavily onomatopoeic poem
Bling-bling, an ideophone for ostentatious accessories
Cross-linguistic onomatopoeias
 Old MacDonald Had a Farm, an American folk song about animal sounds

References

Lists of words
Onomatopoeia